Public Opinion is a surviving 1916 American silent drama film produced by Jesse Lasky and distributed by Paramount Pictures. It was directed by Frank Reicher and stars Blanche Sweet. Margaret Turnbull provided the original screen story and scenario. Public Opinion is one of very few of Blanche Sweet's Paramount Pictures films still in existence. It is preserved by the Library of Congress.

Cast
Blanche Sweet as Hazel Gray
Earle Foxe as Dr. Henry Morgan
Edythe Chapman as Mrs. Carson Morgan
Tom Forman as Phillip Carson
Elliott Dexter as Gordon Graham
Raymond Hatton as Smith
R. Henry Grey (credited as Robert Henry Gray)

See also
Blanche Sweet filmography

References

External links

1916 films
American silent feature films
Films based on short fiction
Paramount Pictures films
1916 drama films
American black-and-white films
Silent American drama films
Films directed by Frank Reicher
1910s American films
1910s English-language films